Gulzar Ahmed (born 1957) is a Pakistani jurist and Justice of the Supreme Court of Pakistan.

Gulzar Ahmed may also refer to:
 Gulzar Ahmed (Sunamganj politician) (died 2019), Bangladeshi politician
 Gulzar Uddin Ahmed (1964–2009), colonel in the Bangladesh Army and Bangladesh Rifles

See also 
 Gulzar Ahmed Chowdhury, Bangladesh politician
 Chaudhary Gulzar Ahmed Gujjar (born 1965), Pakistani politician